Incision may refer to:

 Cutting, the separation of an object, into two or more portions, through the application of an acutely directed force
 A type of open wound caused by a clean, sharp-edged object such as a knife, razor, or glass splinter
 Surgical incision, a cut made through the skin and soft tissue to facilitate an operation or procedure
 River incision, in geomorphology
 Incisions (album), by American deathcore band Oceano
 Incision (band), a Dutch hard rock band
 Incision (G.I. Joe), a fictional character